Biodegradable polymers are a special class of polymer that breaks down after its intended purpose by bacterial decomposition process to result in natural byproducts such as gases (CO2, N2), water, biomass, and inorganic salts.  These polymers are found both naturally and synthetically made, and largely consist of ester, amide, and ether functional groups. Their properties and breakdown mechanism are determined by their exact structure. These polymers are often synthesized by condensation reactions, ring opening polymerization, and metal catalysts. There are vast examples and applications of biodegradable polymers.

Bio-based packaging materials have been introduced as a green alternative in the past decades, among which, edible films have gained more attention due to their environmentally-friendly characteristics, vast variety and availability, non-toxicity, and low cost.

History

Biodegradable polymers have a long history, and since many are natural products, the precise timeline of their discovery and use cannot be accurately traced. One of the first medicinal uses of a biodegradable polymer was the catgut suture, which dates back to at least 100 AD. The first catgut sutures were made from the intestines of sheep, but modern catgut sutures are made from purified collagen extracted from the small intestines of cattle, sheep, or goats.

The concept of synthetic biodegradable plastics and polymers was first introduced in the 1980s. In 1992, an international meeting was called where leaders in biodegradable polymers met to discuss a definition, standard, and testing protocol for biodegradable polymers. Also, oversight organizations such as American Society for Testing of Materials (ASTM) and the International Standards Organization (ISO) were created.  Large clothing and grocery store chains have pushed to utilize biodegradable bags in the late 2010s. Biodegradable polymers also received notice from various fields in 2012 when Professor Geoffrey Coates of Cornell University received the Presidential Green Chemistry Challenge Award. As of 2013, 5-10% of the plastic market focused on biodegradable polymer derived plastics.

Structure and properties
The structure of biodegradable polymers is instrumental in their properties. While there are innumerable biodegradable polymers, both synthetic and natural, there are a few commonalities among them.

Structure
Biodegradable polymers tend to consist of ester, amide, or ether bonds. In general, biodegradable polymers can be grouped into two large groups based on their structure and synthesis. One of these groups is agro-polymers, or those derived from biomass.   The other consists of biopolyesters, which are those derived from microorganisms or synthetically made from either naturally or  synthetic monomers. 

Agro-polymers include polysaccharides, like starches found in potatoes or wood, and proteins, such as animal based whey or plant derived gluten.  Polysacharides consist of glycosidic bonds, which take a hemiacetal of a saccharide and binds it to an alcohol via loss of water. Proteins are made from amino acids, which contain various functional groups.  These amino acids come together again through condensation reactions to form peptide bonds, which consist of amide functional groups.  Examples of biopolyesters include polyhydroxybutyrate and polylactic acid.

Properties

Even though biodegradable polymers have numerous applications, there are properties that tend to be common among them. All biodegradable polymers should be stable and durable enough for use in their particular application, but upon disposal they should easily break down. Polymers, specifically biodegradable polymers, have extremely strong carbon backbones that are difficult to break, such that degradation often starts from the end-groups. Since the degradation begins at the end, a high surface area is common as it allows easy access for either the chemical, light, or organism. Crystallinity is often low as it also inhibits access to end groups. A low degree of polymerization is normally seen, as hinted at above, as doing so allows for more accessible end groups for reaction with the degradation initiator. Another commonality of these polymers is their hydrophillicity. Hydrophobic polymers and end groups will prevent an enzyme from easily interacting if the water-soluble enzyme cannot easily get in contact with the polymer.

Other properties of biodegradable polymers that are common among those used for medicinal usages include being:
 non-toxic
 capable of maintaining good mechanical integrity until degraded
 capable of controlled rates of degradation

A goal is not to elicit the immune response, and the products of degradation also need not to be toxic. These are important as biodegradable polymers are used for drug delivery where it is critical to slowly release the drug into the body over time instead of all at once and that the pill is stable in the bottle until ready to be taken. Factors controlling the rate of degradation include percent crystallinity, molecular weight, and hydrophobicity. The degradation rate depends on the location in the body, which influences the environment surrounding the polymer such as pH, enzymes concentration, and amount of water, among others. These are rapidly decomposed.

Synthesis

One of the most important and most studied groups of biodegradable polymers are polyesters. Polyesters can be synthesized in a number of ways including direct condensation of alcohols and acids, ring opening polymerizations (ROP), and metal-catalyzed polymerization reactions. A great disadvantage of the step-wise polymerization via condensation of an acid and an alcohol is the need to continuously remove water from this system in order to drive the equilibrium of the reaction forward.  This can necessitate harsh reaction conditions and long reaction times, resulting in a wide dispersity. A wide variety of starting materials can be used to synthesize polyesters, and each monomer type endows the final polymer chain with different characteristics and properties. The ROP of cyclic dimeric glycolic or lactic acid forms α-hydroxy acids which then polymerize into poly-(α-esters). A variety of organometallic initiators can be used to start the polymerization of polyesters, including tin, zinc, and aluminum complexes. The most common is tin(II)octanoate and has been approved as a food additive by the U.S. FDA, but there are still concerns about using the tin catalysts in the synthesis of biodegradable polymers for biomedical uses. The synthesis of poly(β-esters) and poly(γ-esters) can be carried out by similar ROP or condensation methods as with poly(γ-esters). Development of metal-free process that involve the use of bacterial or enzymatic catalysis in polyester formation is also being explored.  These reactions have the benefit of generally being regioselective and stereospecific but suffer from the high cost of bacteria and enzymes, long reaction times, and products of low molecular weight.

While polyesters dominate both the research and industrial focus on synthetic biodegradable polymers, other classes of polymers are also of interest. Polyanhydrides are an active area of research in drug delivery because they only degrade from the surface and so are able to release the drug they carry at a constant rate. Polyanhydrides can be made via a variety of methods also used in the synthesis of other polymers, including condensation, dehydrochlorination, dehydrative coupling, and ROP. Polyurethanes and poly(ester amide)s are used in biomaterials. Polyurethanes were initially used for their biocompatibility, durability, resilience, but are more recently being investigated for their biodegradability. Polyurethanes are typically synthesized using a diisocyanate, a diol, and a polymer chain extender. The initial reaction is carried out between the diisocyanate and the diol, with the diisocyanate in excess to ensure that the ends of the new polymer chain are isocyanate groups. This polymer can then be reacted with either a diol or a diamine to form urethane or urethane-urea end groups, respectively. The choice of terminal groups affects the properties of the resulting polymer. Additionally, the use of vegetable oil and biomass in the formation of polyurethanes is an active area of research.

The mechanical properties of biodegradable polymers can be enhanced with the addition of fillers or other polymers to make a composite, blend, or copolymer. Some fillers are natural fiber reinforcements such as silk nanofibers, bamboo, jute, in addition to nano-clay, and carbon nanotubes as alternatives to name a few. Each of these enhancements have a unique property that not only improve strength, but also processability, through humidity resistance, reduced gas permeability, and have shape memory/recovery. Some examples, such as the polyhydroxyalkanoates/polylactic acid blend, shows an exceptional increase in the toughness without sacrificing optical clarity, and the copolymer poly(L-lactide-co-ε-caprolactone) has shown shape memory behavior depending on the concentration of poly-ε-caprolactone added.

Mechanism of breakdown
In general, biodegradable polymers break down to form gases, salts, and biomass. Complete biodegradation is said to occur when there are no oligomers or monomers left. The breakdown of these polymers depend on a variety of factors including the polymer and also, the environment the polymer is in. Polymer properties that influence degradation are bond type, solubility, and copolymers among others.  The surrounding environment of the polymer is just as important as the polymer structure itself. These factors included items such as the pH, temperature, microorganisms present, and water are just a few examples.

There are two primary mechanisms through which biodegradation can occur. One is through physical decomposition through reactions such as hydrolysis and photodegradation, which can lead to partial or complete degradation. The second mechanistic route is through biological processes which can be further broken down into aerobic and anaerobic processes. The first involves aerobic biodegradation, where oxygen is present and important. In this case, the general equation seen below where Cresidue represents smaller fragments of the initial polymer such as oligomers. 

The second mechanism of biodegradation is by anaerobic processes, where oxygen is not present.

There are numerous organisms that have the ability to break down natural polymers. There are also synthetic polymers that have only been around for a hundred years with new features that microorganisms do not have the capability to break down. It will take millions of years before organisms can adapt to degrade all of these new synthetic polymers. Typically, after physical processes carry out the initial breakdown of the polymer, microorganisms will then take what is left and break down the components into even simpler units. These microorganisms normally take polymer fragments, such as oligomers or monomers, into the cell where enzymes work to make adenosine triphosphate (ATP) and polymer end products carbon dioxide, nitrogen gas, methane, water, minerals, and biomass. These enzymes act in a variety of ways to break down polymers including through oxidation or hydrolysis. Examples of key enzymes include proteases, esterases, glycosidases, and manganese peroxidases.

Applications and uses

Biodegradable polymers are of significant interest to a variety of fields including medicine, agriculture, and packaging. One of the most active areas of research in biodegradable polymer is in controlled drug delivery and release.

Medical
Biodegradable polymers have an innumerable uses in the biomedical field, particularly in the fields of tissue engineering and drug delivery. In order for a biodegradable polymer to be used as a therapeutic, it must meet several criteria: 1) be non-toxic in order to eliminate foreign body response; 2) the time it takes for the polymer to degrade is proportional to the time required for therapy; 3) the products resulting from biodegredation are not cytotoxic and are readily eliminated from the body; 4) the material must be easily processed in order to tailor the mechanical properties for the required task; 5) be easily sterilized; and 6) have acceptable shelf life.

Biodegradable polymers are of great interest in the field of drug delivery and nanomedicine. The great benefit of a biodegradable drug delivery system is the ability of the drug carrier to target the release of its payload to a specific site in the body and then degrade into nontoxic materials that are then eliminated from the body via natural metabolic pathways. The polymer slowly degrades into smaller fragments, releasing a natural product, and there is controlled ability to release a drug. The drug slowly releases as polymer degrades. For example, polylactic acid, poly(lactic-co-glycolic) acid, and polycaprolactone, all of which are biodegradable, have been used to carry anti-cancer drugs. Encapsulating the therapeutic in a polymer and adding targeting agents decreases the toxicity of the drug to healthy cells.

Biodegradable polymers and biomaterials are also of significant interest for tissue engineering and regeneration. Tissue engineering is the ability to regenerate tissue with the help of artificial materials. The perfection of such systems can be used to grow tissues and cells in vitro or use a biodegradable scaffold to construct new structures and organs in vitro. For these uses, a biodegradable scaffold is obviously preferred as it reduces the risk of immunological reaction and rejection of the foreign object. While many of the more advanced systems are not ready for human therapeutics, there is significant positive research in animal studies. For example, it was possible to successfully grow rat smooth muscle tissue on a polycaprolactone/polylactide scaffold. Further research and development may allow for this technology to be used for tissue replacement, support, or enhancement in humans. One of the ultimate goals of tissue engineering is the creation of organs, such as the kidney, from basic constituents.  A scaffolding is necessary to grow the entity into a functioning organ, after which the polymer scaffold would degrade and be safely eliminated from the body. There are reports of using polyglycolic acid and polylactic acid to engineer vascular tissue for heart repair.  The scaffold can be used to help create undamaged arteries and vessels.

In addition to tissue engineering, biodegradable polymers are being used in orthopedic applications, such as bone and joint replacement. A wide variety of non-biodegradable polymers have been used for orthopedic applications including silicone rubber, polyethylene, acrylic resins, polyurethane, polypropylene, and polymethylmethacrylate. The primary role of many of these polymers was to act as a biocompatible cement in the fixation of prostheses and in the replacement of joints. Newer biologically compatible synthetic and natural biodegradable polymers have been developed; these include polyglycolide, polylactide, polyhydroxobutyrate, chitosan,  hyaluronic acid, and hydrogels. In particular, poly(2-hydroxyethyl-methacrylate), polyethylene glycol, chitosan, and hyaluronic acid have been used extensively in the repair of cartilage, ligaments, and tendons. For example, poly(L-lactide) (PLA), is used to make screws and darts for meniscal repair and is marketed under the trade name Clearfix Mensical Dart/Screw. PLA is a slow degrading polymer and requires times greater than two years to degrade and be absorbed by the body.

Packaging and materials

In addition to medicine, biodegradable polymers are often used to reduce the volume of waste in packaging materials. There is also significant effort to replace materials derived from petrochemicals with those that can be made from biodegradable components. One of the most commonly used polymers for packaging purposes is polylactic acid, PLA. The production of PLA has several advantages, the most important of which is the ability to tailor the physical properties of the polymer through processing methods. PLA is used for a variety of films, wrappings, and containers (including bottles and cups). In 2002, FDA ruled that PLA was safe to use in all food packaging. BASF markets a product called ecovio® which is a biobased blend of the company's certified compostable and biodegradable co-polyester ecoflex® and PLA. An application for this certified compostable and bio-based material is for any kind of plastic films such as shopping bags or organic waste bags. ecovio® can also be used in other applications, like thermoformed and injection moulded  articles. Even paper-coating or particle foamed products can be produced by this very versatile biopolymer.

Notable examples

2012 Presidential Green Chemistry Challenge

Each year hundreds of millions of tons of plastics are produced from petroleum.  Most of these plastics will remain in landfills for years to come or litter the environment posing significant health risks to animals; however, the average person's lifestyle would be impractical without them (see Applications). One solution to this conundrum lies in biodegradable polymers. These polymers have the distinct advantage that over time they will break down. Dr. Geoffrey Coates headed research to create catalysts that can not only efficiently create these biodegradable polymers, but the polymers also incorporate the greenhouse gas and global warming contributor, CO2, and, environmentally present ground-ozone producer, CO.  These two gases can be found or produced in high concentrations from agricultural waste, coal, and industrial applications as byproducts. Not only do the catalysts utilize these normally wasted and environmentally unfriendly gases, but they also do it extremely efficiently with high turnover numbers and frequencies in addition to good selectivity. These catalysts have been actively used by Novomer Inc to make polycarbonates that can replace the current coating bisphenol A (BPA) found in many food and drink packaging. Novomer's analysis shows that if used in all cases, these biodegradable polymer coatings could not only sequester, but also avoid further production of CO2 in hundreds of millions of metric tons in just a single year.

Future concerns and potential problems
First, the properties such as weight capacity of biodegradable polymer are different from the traditional polymer, which may be unfavorable in many daily applications. Second, engineering issues. Biodegradable polymers are mostly plant-base materials, which means they originally come from organic source like soybean or corn. These organic plants have the chance to be sprayed with pesticides which contain chemicals which can contaminate the crops and be transferred into the final finished product. Third, low biodegradation rate. Compared to the traditional deposition way, the biodegradation for polymer has a longer degradation period. Polyhydroxyalkanoatesas an example, have a degradation period for up to three to six months. Last, the cost issue. The production technology of biodegradable polymer is still immature, the cost of resources such as labor and raw materials in large production quantity scale will be comparable high.

References

External links
Polyketals - esciencenews.com
 "New emerging trends in synthetic biodegradable polymers – Polylactide: A critique." European Polymer Journal, 2007, 43 4053-4074

Polymers